Bansud, officially the Municipality of Bansud,  is a 2nd class municipality in the province of Oriental Mindoro, Philippines. According to the 2020 census, it has a population of 42,671 people.

Etymology
The name of the town is said to be derived from a legend. The legend says that long ago the Mangyans, the aborigines of the Mindoro settled in the lands near the mouth of Bansud River, which they called “Basud” which means Delta. The delta provided fertile soil for the people; hence they lived there peacefully and productively until the time that settlers from the province of Marinduque and Visayan Islands moved in. In many years that followed, the word “Basud” was eventually changed to Bansud.

Geography

Barangays

Bansud is politically subdivided into 13 barangays.

Climate

Demographics

Economy

References

External links
Bansud Profile at PhilAtlas.com
[ Philippine Standard Geographic Code]
Philippine Census Information
Local Governance Performance Management System

Municipalities of Oriental Mindoro